Worthington Presbyterian Church is a historic church in Worthington, Ohio, United States.  Founded in 1805, the congregation is composed of 1,900 members.

The congregation worships in a Colonial Revival church building that was built in 1927.  Under the name of "Worthington United Presbyterian Church," it was listed on the National Register of Historic Places in 1980.

It was designed in Late Gothic Revival style by Columbus, Ohio architects Martin, Orr and Martin, who were in practice together from 1924-1927. They also designed the Late Gothic Revival First Baptist Church of Boulder, in Boulder, Colorado, which was built in 1925-26.

References

External links
 Church website

Presbyterian churches in Ohio
Religious organizations established in 1805
Presbyterian organizations established in the 19th century
20th-century Presbyterian church buildings in the United States
Churches on the National Register of Historic Places in Ohio
Colonial Revival architecture in Ohio
Churches completed in 1927
Churches in Franklin County, Ohio
National Register of Historic Places in Franklin County, Ohio
1805 establishments in Ohio
Worthington, Ohio
High Street (Columbus, Ohio)